CS Minaur Baia Mare is a women's handball team based in Baia Mare, Maramureș, Romania, that competes in the Liga Națională and the European League (formerly known as EHF Cup).

Minaur refers to the gold mines of Baia Mare.

Kits

Record of Achievements
Liga Naţională:
Gold: 2014
Silver: 1979, 2013, 2015, 2016
Bronze: 1980
Cupa României:
Winners: 2013, 2014, 2015
Finalists: 1978, 1980
Semifinalists: 2007, 2016
Supercupa României:
Winners: 2013, 2014, 2015

European

EHF Champions League:
Quarterfinalists: 2015, 2016
EHF Challenge Cup:
Finalists: 2003
EHF Cup Winners' Cup:
Quarterfinalists: 1997

Other tournaments
Baia Mare Champions Trophy:
Winners: 2014
Bucharest Trophy:
Fifth Placed: 2015

Players

Current squad
Squad for the 2022–23 season.

Goalkeepers 
 1  Cristina Enache
 12  Ioana Ugran
 16  Amra Pandžić 
Wingers
LW
 9  Ana Maria Tănasie 
 21  Éva Kerekes
RW
 4  Dijana Ujkic 
 6  Amalia Terciu
 55  Oana Borș
Line players
 5  Itana Čavlović
 23  Andreea Țîrle

Back players
LB
 11  Sanja Vujović
 15  Talita Alves Carneiro
 23  Raluca Tudor
 28  Magda Cazanga
CB
 7  Aleksandra Vukajlović
 22  Luciana Popescu
 70  Andreea Popa
RB 
 18  Aleksandra Zych
 99  Anca Mițicuș (c)

Transfers
Transfers for the 2023–24 season

 Arriving
  Amelia Lundbäck (CB) (from  Skuru IK)
  Alba Spugnini (LP) (from  Rocasa Gran Canaria)
  María Gomes Da Costa (LB) (from  Rocasa Gran Canaria)
  Amalia Coman (CB) (from  SCM Râmnicu Vâlcea)

 Leaving 
  Andreea Popa (CB) (to  HC Dunărea Brăila)

Staff members
  Head Coach: Costică Buceschi
  Assistant Coach: Magdalena Kovács
  Goalkeeping Coach: Claudia Cetățeanu

Notable former players

  Elisabeta Ionescu
  Maria Bosi-Igorov
  Hilda Hrivnak-Popescu
  Niculina Sasu-Iordache
  Mariana Iacob-Iluţ
  Larisa Cazacu
  Ildikó Kerekes
  Cristina Mihai
  Carmen Buceschi
  Maria Pop
  Nadina Dumitru
  Victorina Stoenescu-Bora
  Marinela Doiciu-Győrffy
  Claudia Cetăţeanu
  Magda Kengyel
  Laura Crăciun
  Ana-Maria Buican
  Camelia Balint
  Annamária Ilyés
  Anca David
  Florina Nicolescu
  Eliza Buceschi
  Bárbara Arenhart
  Camilla Herrem
  Ksenia Makeeva
  Ekaterina Davydenko
  Adriana Nechita
  Allison Pineau
  Melinda Geiger
  Lois Abbingh
  Paula Ungureanu
  Gabriela Perianu
  Katarina Ježić
  Alexandra do Nascimento
  Luciana Marin
  Patricia Vizitiu
  Ionica Munteanu
  Valentina Ardean-Elisei
  Sonia Seraficeanu 
  Jovana Kovačević  
  Linn Blohm

Notable former managers

  Costică Buceschi
  Constantin Popescu
  Ioan Băban
  Gheorghe Sbora
  Gheorghe Covaciu
  Ion Gerhard
  Vasile Barbul

External links
   
 

 

Romanian handball clubs
Handball clubs established in 2015
Liga Națională (women's handball) clubs
Sport in Baia Mare
2015 establishments in Romania